Andraca melli is a moth of the family Endromidae. It is found in China (Zhejiang, Jiangxi, Fujian, Guangdong, Hainan), Vietnam and Thailand.

The head is thinly covered with brown-green hairs. The forewings are bluntly pointed apically and the outer edge is smooth and straight. The tornus is nearly rectangular.

The larvae feed on Camellia sinensis, Camellia oleifera, Fraxinus pennsylvanica, Ternstroemia japonica and Pentaphylax euryoides.

References

External links

Moths described in 2009
Moths of Asia
Andraca